Leptrichillus minutus is a species of beetle in the family Cerambycidae, the only species in the genus Leptrichillus.

References

Acanthocinini